Tonawanda may refer to:

Tonawanda (CDP), New York, consisting of the Town of Tonawanda less the Village of Kenmore
Tonawanda (city), New York, officially City of Tonawanda, bordered on three sides by the Town of Tonawanda
Tonawanda (town), New York, officially Town of Tonawanda in Erie County north of Buffalo, New York
North Tonawanda, New York, a city in Niagara County, north across Tonawanda Creek from the City and Town
Tonawanda Armory, listed on the National Register of Historic Places
Tonawanda Band of Seneca, federally recognized tribe in New York state
Tonawanda Creek, a tributary of the Niagara River and part of the Erie Canal
Tonawanda Engine, a General Motors engine factory in Buffalo, New York
Tonawanda Kardex Lumbermen, a defunct NFL team based in North Tonawanda
Tonawanda Reservation, on Tonawanda Creek in Erie, Genesee, and Niagara counties
Lake Tonawanda, prehistoric glacial lake